The Port Charlotte Invitational was a golf tournament on the LPGA Tour, played only in 1969. It was played at the Port Charlotte Golf & Country Club in Port Charlotte, Florida. Kathy Whitworth won the event by one stroke over Sandra Haynie and Sandra Post.

References

Former LPGA Tour events
Golf in Florida
Charlotte County, Florida
Women's sports in Florida